"Movin' Up" is the debut single from Swedish Eurodance band Dreamworld. It was released in 1995 in Europe and Australia, peaking at number 12 on the ARIA Singles Chart. It charted on the Billboard Dance/Club Play chart for 7 weeks, peaking at number 30 in March 1996. It is the best known single from the band and their only international hit. It was re-released in 1997 shortly before the band split up.

In 1996, the song was adapted in Spanish by Mexican singer Paulina Rubio as "Despiértate" and included on her fourth studio album, Planeta Paulina.

The song was covered by Dannii Minogue and released on her 1997 album, Girl.

Track listings
Swedish CD single
 "Movin' Up" (Radio Version) — 3:38
 "Movin' Up" (Extended Version) — 5:47
 "Movin' Up" (The Elephant Mix) — 5:36

Australian CD single
 "Movin' Up" — 3:38
 "Movin' Up" (P.G. Tips Satellite Mix) — 6:32
 "Movin' Up" (The Party Faithful Mix) — 6:09
 "Movin' Up" (Elephant Mix) — 5:36
 "Movin' Up" (Empire State Mix) — 5:49

US CD maxi
 "Movin' Up" (Extended Version) — 5:47
 "Movin' Up" (Lenny Bertoldo Club Mix) — 6:39
 "Movin' Up" (Lenny Bertoldo Extended Mix) — 5:57
 "Movin' Up" (PG Tips Satellite Mix) — 8:26

Charts and sales

Weekly charts

Year-end charts

Certifications

References

Eurodance songs